The following is a list of clubs who have played in Allsvenskan at any time since its formation in 1924–25 to the current season. Allsvenskan teams playing in the 2017 Allsvenskan season are indicated in bold. If the longest spell is the current spell, this is indicated in bold. A total of 63 teams have played in Allsvenskan.

All statistics here refer to time in the Allsvenskan only, with the exception of 'Last promotion' which refers to the club's last promotion from the second tier of Swedish football.

Allsvenskan